Natalie Haas is an American cellist, originally from Menlo Park, California. A graduate of the Juilliard School, she has toured and recorded extensively with Scottish fiddler Alasdair Fraser. Also, she has toured and recorded with Mark O'Connor and his Appalachia Waltz Trio, and with Natalie MacMaster. She has appeared on more than 100 albums.

Haas teaches privately and at the Berklee College of Music as an associate professor in Boston.

Haas's sister, Brittany Haas, is also a professional musician, playing fiddle in the alternative bluegrass band Crooked Still (currently on extended hiatus), with the trio Haas Kowert Tice, with the Dave Rawlings Machine, and on A Prairie Home Companion.

Discography
Syzygy 2021 with Alasdair Fraser
 Ports of Call 2017 with Alasdair Fraser
Abundance 2013 with Alasdair Fraser
Highlander's Farewell 2011 with Alasdair Fraser
Acoustic Project 2011 with Laura Cortese, Brittany Haas and Hanneke Cassel
In the Moment 2007 with Alasdair Fraser
Fire & Grace 2004 with Alasdair Fraser
Legacy of the Scottish Fiddle Vol. 2 2004 with Alasdair Fraser & Muriel Johnstone
Crossing Bridges 2004 live with Mark O'Connor's Appalachia Waltz Trio

References

External links

Living people
American cellists
Juilliard School alumni
Women cellists
Year of birth missing (living people)
People from Menlo Park, California
Berklee College of Music faculty
Women music educators